Elizabeth 'Betty' Mary Morgan MBE (born 1942) is a Welsh international lawn and indoor bowler. She was appointed an MBE in 2005.

Bowls career
Morgan made her Welsh debut in 1976 and won multiple Welsh national titles.

World Outdoor Championship
Morgan won the bronze medal in the women's triples during the 1996 World Outdoor Bowls Championship and a silver medal with Caroline Taylor in the women's pairs at the 2004 World Outdoor Bowls Championship in Leamington Spa.

Commonwealth Games
Morgan won a silver medal in the singles at the 2006 Commonwealth Games. She also competed in the fours at the 1994 Commonwealth Games and in the singles at the 2002 Commonwealth Games.

Atlantic Championships
In 1993 she won the fours silver medal at the Atlantic Bowls Championships and four years later in her home country she won the singles bronze medal and the triples gold medal. A fourth medal was won in 2005 when she won the singles silver medal at the Championships.

British Isles
Morgan has won the British Isles Bowls Championships singles title three times in 1995, 1998 and 2003, a record only bettered by Irish bowler Margaret Johnston. In addition to the three singles titles she has won ten other British Isles titles; pairs (1994, 1995, 1996, 2003 and 2011), triples (1990 & 2003), fours (1978, 1999 & 2011). The 2003 success created history because she was the first woman to win the singles, pairs and triples in the same year.

National
Outdoors, Morgan has won 26 Welsh National Bowls Championships.
singles - 1984, 1986, 1991, 1994, 1997, 2002
pairs - 1980, 1993, 1994, 1995, 2002, 2010, 2011, 2019
triples - 1989, 1999, 2002, 2009
fours - 1977, 1983, 1993, 1998, 1999, 2010, 2014, 2016

References

Living people
1942 births
Welsh female bowls players
People from Llandrindod Wells
Sportspeople from Powys
Commonwealth Games medallists in lawn bowls
Commonwealth Games silver medallists for Wales
Bowls players at the 1994 Commonwealth Games
Bowls players at the 2002 Commonwealth Games
Bowls players at the 2006 Commonwealth Games
Medallists at the 2006 Commonwealth Games